Pyrrharctia isabella, the isabella tiger moth, whose larval form is called the banded woolly bear, woolly bear, or woolly worm, occurs in the United States and southern Canada. It was first formally named by James Edward Smith in 1797.

Description
The thirteen-segment larvae are usually covered with brown hair in their mid-regions and black hair in their anterior and posterior areas. In direct sunlight, the brown hair looks bright reddish brown. Adults are generally dull yellowish through orangish and have robust, scaly thoraces; small heads; and bright reddish-orange forelegs. Wings have sparse black spotting.

The isabella tiger moth can be found in many cold regions, including the Arctic. The banded woolly bear larva emerges from the egg in the fall and overwinters in its caterpillar form, when it literally freezes solid. First its heart stops beating, then its gut freezes, then its blood, followed by the rest of the body. It survives being frozen by producing a cryoprotectant in its tissues. In the spring it thaws.

Larval setae do not inject venom and are not urticant; they do not typically cause irritation, injury, inflammation, or swelling. Handling larvae is discouraged, however, because their sharp, spiny hairs may cause dermatitis in some people.

Diet

This species is a generalist feeder, consuming many plant species, including herbs and trees. Based on the caterpillars' wide range of food plants, this moth could be found almost anywhere that plants grow.

Related species
Singer et al. showed that the larvae of a related moth, Grammia incorrupta (whose larvae are also called "woollybears"), consume alkaloid-laden leaves that help fight off internal parasitic fly larvae. This phenomenon has been proposed to be "the first clear demonstration of self-medication among insects." Within the same family, the larvae of the garden tiger moth (Arctia caja) are also known as woollybear caterpillars and consume an alkaloid diet similar to Grammia incorrupta.

In culture

Folklore

Canadian and U.S. folklore holds that the relative amounts of brown and black hair on a larva indicate the severity of the coming winter. It is believed that if a Pyrrharctia isabella brown band is wide, winter weather will be mild, and if the brown band is narrow, the winter will be severe. In a variation of this story, the color of stripes predicts the winter weather, with darker stripes indicating a harsher winter. In reality, hatchlings from the same clutch of eggs can display considerable variation in their color banding, and a larva's brown band tends to widen with age as it molts.

Another version of this belief is that the direction in which a Pyrrharctia isabella crawls indicates the winter weather, with the caterpillar crawling south to escape colder weather. There is no scientific evidence for winter weather prediction by Pyrrharctia isabella.

Woollybear festivals

Woollybear festivals are held in several locations in the fall.
Vermilion, Ohio, in October, begun in 1973, the Woollybear Festival features woollybear costume contests for children and pets and the Woolybear 500 caterpillar races.
Banner Elk, North Carolina, begun in 1977, features crafts, food, and races. The winning woollybear predicts the winter weather for the following winter.
Beattyville, Kentucky, begun 1988, called the Woolly Worm Festival, features food, vendors, live music, and a Woolly Worm Race in which people race the woollybear caterpillar up vertical strings.
Oil City, Pennsylvania, Woolley Bear Jamboree, begun in 2008, features Oil Valley Vick to predict the winter weather.
Little Valley, New York, has held a Woolley Bear Weekend  since 2012.

References

External links

Spilosomina
Moths of North America
Weather lore
Moths described in 1797